Tropic Fury is a 1939 American action film directed by Christy Cabanne and starring Richard Arlen, Andy Devine and Beverly Roberts.

Cast
 Richard Arlen as Dan Burton  
 Andy Devine as Tynan ('Tiny') Andrews 
 Beverly Roberts as Judith Adams 
 Louis Merrill as Porthos Scipio  
 Lupita Tovar as Maria Scipio  
 Samuel S. Hinds as J.P. Waterford  
 Charles Trowbridge as Dr. Taylor  
 Leonard Mudie as J.T.M. Gallon  
 Adia Kuznetzoff as Soledad - Slave-Driver  
 Noble Johnson as Hannibal - Slave-Driver  
 Frank Mitchell as Amando - Peg-legged Peon  
 Milburn Stone as Thomas E. Snell

References

Bibliography
 Pancho Kohner. Lupita Tovar The Sweetheart of Mexico. Xlibris Corporation, 2011.

External links

1939 films
American action films
American black-and-white films
1930s action films
Films directed by Christy Cabanne
Universal Pictures films
1930s English-language films
1930s American films